Golder is a surname. Notable people with the surname include:

Alan Golder (born 1955), American burglar
Benjamin M. Golder (1891–1946), American politician
Douglas Golder (born 1948), Australian field hockey player
Frank A. Golder (1877–1929), American historian, scholar and writer
Gabriela Golder (born 1971), Argentine artist and curator
Herbert Golder (born 1952), American academic
Jamie Golder (born 1962), American tennis player
Jimmy Golder (1955–2000), English professional footballer
Matt Golder, political scientist
Scott Golder (born 1976), New Zealand cricketer
Stanley Golder (1929–2000), American financier
Sue Golder (born 1946), New Zealand athlete and track cyclist
Tom Golder (born 1944), Australian field hockey player

See also
David Golder, novel by Irène Némirovsky 
David Golder (film), French film of the novel of the same name by Irène Némirovsky 
Golder Associates, a global consulting firm
Golder Cottage, early New Zealand colonial cottage built by John Golder